Marek Grabowski (8 February 1950 – 7 May 2022) was a Polish doctor and politician. A member of Self-Defence of the Republic of Poland, he served as undersecretary of state to the Ministry of Health from 2006 to 2007. He died in Częstochowa on 7 May 2022 at the age of 72.

References

1950 births
2022 deaths
20th-century Polish physicians
21st-century Polish physicians
21st-century Polish politicians
People from Częstochowa
Rectors of universities in Poland
Polish United Workers' Party members
Democratic Left Alliance politicians
Self-Defence of the Republic of Poland politicians
Recipients of the Gold Cross of Merit (Poland)
Recipients of the Silver Cross of Merit (Poland)
Recipients of the Bronze Cross of Merit (Poland)
Officers of the Order of Polonia Restituta